Federal Hocking High School (FHHS) is a public high school in Stewart, Ohio.  It is the only high school in the Federal Hocking Local School District. The school mascot is the Lancers.  The communities of Amesville and Coolville are served by the district.  These two communities have elementary schools.

Athletics

The Lancers belong to the Ohio High School Athletic Association (OHSAA) and the Tri-Valley Conference, a 16-member athletic conference located in southeastern Ohio.  The conference is divided into two divisions based on school size.  The Ohio Division features the larger schools and the Hocking Division features the smaller schools, including Federal Hocking.

See also
 Ohio High School Athletic Conferences

References

External links
 District Website

High schools in Athens County, Ohio
Public high schools in Ohio
Public middle schools in Ohio